Basri Dirimlili (7 June 1929 – 14 September 1997), nicknamed Mehmetcik Basri, was a Turkish football player.

Career
Born in Dârstor, Romania (now Silistra, Bulgaria), Dirimlili began playing football for Eskişehir Demirspor. He transferred to Fenerbahçe in 1951. He played 26 times for Turkey and was a member of 1952 National Olympic Team and the 1954 FIFA World Cup team.

He also worked as assistant manager for Fenerbahçe with Ignace Molnar, Traian Ionescu, Didi and Branko Stanković. He also managed Feriköy, Vefa S.K., Samsunspor and Istanbulspor.

References

External links

1929 births
1997 deaths
People from Silistra
Turkish footballers
Turkey international footballers
Romanian footballers
Romanian people of Turkish descent
Olympic footballers of Turkey
Footballers at the 1952 Summer Olympics
1954 FIFA World Cup players
Fenerbahçe S.K. footballers
Karşıyaka S.K. footballers
Turkish football managers
Samsunspor managers
Vefa S.K. managers
İstanbulspor managers
Association football defenders